Narrung is a locality located in the local government area of the Rural City of Swan Hill in Victoria, Australia. Narrung post office opened in 1902 and was closed on 17 February 1969.

It was also the site of a Victorian government customs house.

References

Towns in Victoria (Australia)
Rural City of Swan Hill